Bob Hewitt and Frew McMillan were the defending champions.

Hewitt and McMillan successfully defended their title, defeating Tom Okker and Marty Riessen 6–4, 4–6, 6–4 in the final.

Seeds

Draw

Finals

Top half

Bottom half

External links
 Draw

Stockholm Open
1976 Grand Prix (tennis)